Sarakino  is a Greek island in the Sporades south of Skyros. , it had no resident population.

References

External links
Sarakino on GTP Travel Pages (in English and Greek)

Islands of Central Greece
Landforms of Euboea (regional unit)
Islands of Greece